LVCI 79-90 were a group of  steam locomotives of the LVCI, a private company of Austria-Hungary. The 12 Locomotives were supplied by Koechlin in 1858. They were very similar to LCVI 51–60.

Names
The locomotives were named: Paisiello, Ariosto, Tasso, Petrarca, Raffaello, Michelangelo, Giotto, Cimabue, Bramante, Torricelli, Oriani, Cavalli

Ownership changes
The Sudbahn took 10 of these 12 Locomotives, calling them Group SB 5. The "Ariosto" and "Raffaello" remained with the LVCI. They later became SFAI 381–382, RM 2019-2020 and FS 1181–1182.

References

Further reading

    Herbert Dietrich: Die Südbahn und ihre Vorläufer. Bohmann Verlag, Wien, 1994, 
    Hans Peter Pawlik, Josef Otto Slezak: Südbahn-Lokomotiven. Verlag Slezak, Wien, 1987, 
    P.M. Kalla-Bishop: Italian State Railways Steam Locomotives. Tourret Publishing, Abingdon, 1986, 

2-4-0 locomotives
Railway locomotives introduced in 1858
Standard gauge locomotives of Italy
Rete Mediterranea steam locomotives